Mohamed Abbas Helmy is an Egyptian Air Marshal.  he serves as Commander of the Egyptian Air Force.

References 

Living people
Year of birth missing (living people)
Place of birth missing (living people)
Egyptian Air Academy alumni
Egyptian Air Force air marshals